A total lunar eclipse took place on May 16, 2003, the first of two total lunar eclipses in 2003, the other being on November 9, 2003.

This lunar eclipse is first of a tetrad, four total lunar eclipses in series. The previous series was in 1985 and 1986, starting with a May 1985 lunar eclipse. The next one was in 2014 and 2015, starting with the April 15, 2014 lunar eclipse.

Visibility

Gallery

Relation to other lunar eclipses

Eclipse season 

This is the first eclipse this season.

Second eclipse this season: 31 May 2003 Annular Solar Eclipse

Eclipses of 2003 

 A total lunar eclipse on May 16.
 An annular solar eclipse (one limit) on May 31.
 A total lunar eclipse on November 9.
 A total solar eclipse on November 23.

Lunar year series 

It is also the second of four lunar year cycles, repeating every 354 days.

Metonic series 

This eclipse is the second of four Metonic cycle lunar eclipses on the same date, May 15–16, each separated by 19 years.

Half-Saros cycle
A lunar eclipse will be preceded and followed by solar eclipses by 9 years and 5.5 days (a half saros). This lunar eclipse is related to two annular solar eclipses of Solar Saros 128.

See also 
List of lunar eclipses and List of 21st-century lunar eclipses
November 2003 lunar eclipse
October 2004 lunar eclipse
May 2004 lunar eclipse

References

External links 
 Saros cycle 121
 
 NASA Saros series 121
 Lunar Eclipse Gallery
 Pictures of the May 15-16 Lunar Eclipse
 Prof. Druckmüller's eclipse photography site. Czech Republic

2003-05
2003 in science
May 2003 events